Lauren Abbie Taylor (born 26 August 1994) is an English professional golfer and Ladies European Tour player. She won The Women's Amateur Championship in 2011.

Early life and amateur career
Taylor was born and raised in Rugby. Her younger sister Charlotte also plays golf successfully.

She attended Ashlawn School, won the English Girls Under 15's title in 2008. She won the Dutch Junior Championships 2011 and 2012 and was given a wildcard for the Dutch Ladies Open on both occasions. She received sponsors' invitations to the Ladies European Tour Slovak Ladies Open in 2012, having qualified for the same event in 2011. During the 2011 event, she recorded two consecutive eagles on the par-5 4th hole and par-3 5th hole at Gray Bear Golf Club.

Taylor became the youngest winner of the British Ladies Amateur in 2011, at the age of 16. As a result, she was originally offered a place in the 2012 U.S. Women's Open, but the invitation was later withdrawn in favour of the 2012 British Amateur champion.

Taylor played college golf at Baylor University, having previously played for Woburn Golf Club.

Taylor won the BBC Young Sports Personality of the Year in 2011.

Professional career
Taylor turned professional in September 2013 and won her first tournament as a professional, the Norrporten Ladies Open, on the LET Access Series. In 2014, she joined the Ladies European Tour.

Amateur wins
2008 English Girls Championship
2011 Dutch Junior Championship, British Ladies Amateur
2012 Dutch Junior Championship

Professional wins

LET Access Series wins (1)

Team appearances
Amateur
Junior Solheim Cup (representing Europe): 2011

References

External links

English female golfers
Baylor Bears women's golfers
Ladies European Tour golfers
Winners of ladies' major amateur golf championships
Sportspeople from Rugby, Warwickshire
1994 births
Living people